The 2004 NCAA Division I men's ice hockey tournament involved 16 schools playing in single-elimination play to determine the national champion of men's NCAA Division I college ice hockey. It began on March 26, 2004, and ended with the championship game on April 10. A total of 15 games were played. This was the first season in which the Atlantic Hockey sent a representative to the tournament. Atlantic Hockey assumed possession of the automatic bid that had been the possession of the MAAC after it collapsed and all remaining ice hockey programs formed the new conference.

The University of Denver, coached by George Gwozdecky, won its sixth national title with a 1-0 victory in the final game over the University of Maine, coached by Tim Whitehead before a record crowd of over 18,000 people at Boston's FleetCenter (now known as the TD Garden). While Denver's Gabe Gauthier scored the game's only goal, the game is best remembered for Denver surviving Maine's six skaters to three skaters advantage in the final 90 seconds of the contest.

Denver goaltender Adam Berkhoel was named the tournament Most Outstanding Player.

Game locations

The NCAA Men's Division I Ice Hockey Championship is a single-elimination tournament featuring 16 teams representing all six Division I conferences in the nation.  The Championship Committee seeds the entire field from 1 to 16 within four regionals of 4 teams. The winners of the six Division I conference championships receive automatic bids to participate in the NCAA Championship. Regional placements are based primarily on the home location of the top seed in each bracket with an attempt made to put the top-ranked teams close to their home site.

First round and regional finals
 East – Pepsi Arena, Albany, New York — Host: Rensselaer
 Midwest – Van Andel Arena, Grand Rapids, Michigan — Host: Western Michigan
 Northeast – Verizon Wireless Arena, Manchester, New Hampshire — Host: New Hampshire
 West – World Arena, Colorado Springs, Colorado — Host: Colorado College

Frozen Four
 FleetCenter, Boston

Qualifying teams
The at-large bids and seeding for each team in the tournament was announced on March 21, 2004. The Western Collegiate Hockey Association (WCHA) and the Central Collegiate Hockey Association (CCHA) each had five teams receive a berth in the tournament, Hockey East had three teams receive a berth in the tournament, while Atlantic Hockey, College Hockey America (CHA) and the ECAC each received a single bid for their tournament champions.

Number in parentheses denotes overall seed in the tournament.

Brackets

East Regional

Northeast Regional

Midwest Regional

West Regional

Frozen Four

Note: * denotes overtime period(s)

Regional semifinals

East Regional

(1) Maine vs. (4) Harvard

(2) Ohio State vs. (3) Wisconsin

Midwest Regional

(1) Minnesota vs. (4) Notre Dame

(2) Minnesota-Duluth vs. (3) Michigan State

Northeast Regional

(1) Boston College vs. (4) Niagara

(2) Michigan vs. (3) New Hampshire

West Regional

(1) North Dakota vs. (4) Holy Cross

(2) Denver vs. (3) Miami

Regional Finals

East Regional

(1) Maine vs. (3) Wisconsin

Midwest Regional

(1) Minnesota vs. (2) Minnesota-Duluth

Northeast Regional

(1) Boston College vs. (2) Michigan

West Regional

(1) North Dakota vs. (2) Denver

Frozen Four

National semifinal

(E1) Maine vs. (NE1) Boston College

(MW2) Minnesota-Duluth vs. (W2) Denver

National Championship

(E1) Maine vs. (W2) Denver

All-Tournament team
G: Adam Berkhoel* (Denver)
D: Ryan Caldwell (Denver)
D: Prestin Ryan (Maine)
F: Junior Lessard (Minnesota-Duluth)
F: Dustin Penner (Maine)
F: Connor James (Denver)
* Most Outstanding Player(s)

Record by conference

References

Tournament
NCAA Division I men's ice hockey tournament
NCAA Division I men's ice hockey tournament
NCAA Division I men's ice hockey tournament
NCAA Division I men's ice hockey tournament
NCAA Division I men's ice hockey tournament
NCAA Division I men's ice hockey tournament
NCAA Division I men's ice hockey tournament
NCAA Division I men's ice hockey tournament
NCAA Division I men's ice hockey tournament
2000s in Colorado Springs, Colorado
History of Grand Rapids, Michigan
Ice hockey competitions in Boston
Ice hockey competitions in Colorado Springs, Colorado
Ice hockey competitions in Michigan
Ice hockey competitions in New Hampshire
Ice hockey competitions in Albany, New York
Sports in Grand Rapids, Michigan
Sports in Manchester, New Hampshire